Coria may refer to:

Places
Municipalities in Spain:
Coria, Cáceres
Coria del Río, Sevilla

A Brythonic equivalent of the Latin Curia, used as a place-name in Roman Britain and elsewhere:
Coria (Corbridge), a Roman fort and town in Northumberland, England
Coria (Inveresk), a Roman fort in Midlothian, Scotland

Other uses
Coria (surname)

See also
 Corea (disambiguation)
 Corium (disambiguation)